Relentless is the debut studio album by American doom metal band Pentagram. It was self-released in 1985 as Pentagram, but was reissued by Peaceville Records in 1993 with the new title and track listing. It was also issued as a two-disc split CD with Day of Reckoning in 1996 and then re-released again in 2005 as a digipak CD. The album is now commonly known as Relentless.

The album was originally recorded and released in 1982 on the All Your Sins demo tape, as Death Row. The band decided to re-record some vocals and guitar parts in 1984 and created a complete new mix for their self-released debut album. The 1984 remix of the recordings appeared only on first-edition vinyl copies of the album (those with the purple logo on the cover) and that mix was never released on CD or later vinyl pressings. When Peaceville reissued the album on CD in 1993, they restored the 1982 mix and track listing to save the original spirit and charm of the recordings. All CD and LP versions released since 1993 contain the original 1982 version.

Track listing

Original version (Pentagram)

1993 reissue (Relentless)

Lineup
Bobby Liebling – vocals
Victor Griffin – guitar
Martin Swaney – bass
Joe Hasselvander – drums

References

1985 debut albums
Pentagram (band) albums